Jack Brennan (born 1937) is a retired United States Marine Corps officer and former political aide

Jack Brennan may also refer to:

Jack Brennan (baseball) (1862–1914), American baseball catcher
Jack Brennan (footballer, born 1892) (1892–1942), English footballer
Jack Brennan (Australian footballer) (1897–1987), Australian rules footballer
Jack Brennan (rugby league), English rugby league footballer

See also
John Brennan (disambiguation)